Eulaema is a genus of large-bodied euglossine bees that occur primarily in the Neotropics. They are robust brown or black bees, hairy or velvety, and often striped with yellow or orange, typically resembling bumblebees. They lack metallic coloration as occurs in the related genus Eufriesea.

Distribution
Eulaema is found from Rio Grande do Sul (Brazil), Misiones (Argentina) and Paraguay to northern Mexico with occasional strays into the United States.

Species

References

 
Bee genera
Hymenoptera of North America
Hymenoptera of South America
Orchid pollinators